Neotylenchidae is a family of nematodes belonging to the order Tylenchida.

Genera

Genera:
 Abursanema Yaghoubi, Pourjam, Pedram, Siddiqi & Atighi, 2014
 Anguillonema Fuchs, 1938
 Boleodorus Thorne, 1941

References

Nematodes